Solomon's Stables is an underground vaulted space now used as a Muslim prayer hall by the name of Al-Marwani Mosque, some 600 square yards (500 square metres) in area, at the bottom of stairs which lead down from the al-Aqsa Mosque, under the al-Aqsa Mosque, to the base of the southern wall of the enclave of al-Aqsa Mosque in Jerusalem. In December 1996 the Waqf converted the area into a prayer hall by adding lights and floor tiles, and renamed it the El-Marwani Prayer Hall.

History

The structure is most widely said to have been built by the Ummayad Caliph Abd al-Malik and some claim it is from the time of King Herod (reigned 37–4 BCE) as part of his extension of the platform of the al-Aqsa Mosque southward onto the Ophel. The Herodian engineers constructed the enormous, almost rectangular platform above the slopes of the hill known as the Temple Mount, by building a substructure consisting of a series of vaulted arches in order to reduce pressure on the retaining walls. These vaults, "supported by eighty-eight pillars resting on massive Herodian blocks and divided into twelve rows of galleries", were originally storage areas of the Second Temple. A great deal of the original interior survives in the area of the Herodian staircases, although not in the area now renovated for use as a mosque. Visitors are rarely permitted to enter the areas with Herodian finishes.

The underground space for the most part remained empty except during Crusader rule over Jerusalem. The Crusaders converted it into a stable for the cavalry. The rings for tethering horses can still be seen on some of the pillars. The structure has been called Solomon's Stables since the time of the Crusades as a historical composite: 'Solomon's' refers to the First Temple built on the site, while the 'stables' refers to the functional usage of the space by the Crusaders in the time of Baldwin II (King of Jerusalem 1118–1131 CE).

Modern construction of the El-Marwani Mosque
In the winter of 1996 the Jerusalem Islamic Waqf acquired a permit to use Solomon's Stables as an alternative place of worship for occasional rainy days of the holy month of Ramadan. Later the Waqf declared that it aimed to create a mosque for 10,000 worshippers, making it the largest mosque in the country. This move was designed to strengthen the Muslim claim over the Temple Mount.

The Waqf began digging a huge hole in the southeastern area of the Temple Mount, without a permit from the Jerusalem municipality or archaeological supervision using tractors and heavy vehicles. This action drew criticism from archaeologists, who said that archaeological strata and artifacts were being damaged in the process and the excavations weakened the stability of the Southern Wall. The excavations are thought to have been responsible for creating a large, visible bulge in the Southern Wall that threatened the structural integrity of the Temple Mount, necessitating major repairs.  The repairs have been called "unsightly" because they appear as a large, bright, white patch of smooth stones in a golden tan wall of rusticated ashlar.

In December 1996 the new mosque was officially inaugurated as El-Marwani Mosque.

In 1999, construction began on an emergency exit for the El-Marwani Mosque. In doing so, bulldozers dug a pit more than 131 feet long and nearly 40 feet deep, with lorry trucks carting away hundreds of tons of soil and debris from the area. In order to preserve the archaeological integrity of the site, the soil that had been carted away was reclaimed by Israeli archaeologists, who began sifting through the removed earth in search of undisclosed artefacts, a project that became known as the Temple Mount Sifting Project.

2019 fire
On April 15, 2019, a minor fire broke out in the guard room in the courtyard of El-Marwani Mosque. The Waqf fire brigade succeeded in putting out the fire. From some angles it appeared as if smoke was coming out of the underground mosque itself.

Alternative history of Solomon's Stables
Jordanian scholar Raef Yusuf Najm suggests that the mosque was initially a water reservoir that had been built by the Roman Emperor Hadrian in the second century, along with the stone wall currently surrounding al-Aqsa Mosque. "Its overall structure closely resembles that of the Roman Ramla reservoir with stone pillars and junctions. That the reservoir was built at the same time as the wall is evident since the southern and eastern walls of the reservoir are a continuation of the wall surrounding al-Aqsa Mosque. Instead of an addition built long after the wall, the reservoir was built at the same time, as can be inferred from the joining of the stones.
The reservoir was used to collect water flowing into it from surrounding areas, through horizontal aqueducts made of stone and feeding into vertical canals in the external walls of the reservoir. One of these vertical canals can still be seen today and is located at the level of the main entrance of the El-Marwani Mosque. It is semi-circular and is lined with a Roman fuller of limestone mixed with ground clay and sand. The flooring of the reservoir is made of stone, but is covered with layers of silt that have accumulated over the years."

Artifacts
The soil removed from the dig was dumped near the Mount of Olives and a salvage operation, the Temple Mount Sifting Project, was undertaken in order to sift through the debris for archaeological remains. Many important finds have turned up. Israeli Antiques Authority published a report in 1999. According to this report:
 14 percent of the shards dated to the First Temple period
 19 percent to the Second Temple period
 6 percent to the Roman period
 14 percent to the Byzantine period
 15 percent to the early Muslim and medieval periods
 32 percent could not be identified.
In a June 2000 interview with The Jerusalem Post, the chief Waqf archaeologist said that his colleagues examined the material taken out of the dig "either before or after the excavation" and "found nothing of special interest". In 2016 exquisite floor tiles of the Roman opus sectile type discovered during the sifting process were published and interpreted as likely belonging to the Herodian Temple complex, where they were adorning the floors of the porticos.

Gallery

References

External links

Interior views video (Arabic)
Solomon's Stables and the Southern Gates
Photos of Solomon's Stables at the Manar al-Athar photo archive

Buildings and structures completed in the 1st century BC
Military installations established in the 11th century
Cavalry
Classical sites in Jerusalem
Herod the Great
Kingdom of Jerusalem
Knights Templar
Medieval sites in Jerusalem
Mosques in Jerusalem
Second Temple
Stables
Temple Mount
Umayyad architecture in the State of Palestine
Solomon